The Windsors is a British sitcom and parody of the British royal family, the House of Windsor. It was first broadcast on Channel 4 in April 2016 and stars Harry Enfield, Haydn Gwynne, Hugh Skinner, Louise Ford, Richard Goulding, Tom Durant-Pritchard, Kathryn Drysdale, Morgana Robinson, Ellie White, and Celeste Dring.

Written by the co-creators of Star Stories, Bert Tyler-Moore and George Jeffrie, The Windsors is a satirical portrayal of the British royal family. A fourth series is scheduled for 2023, including a Coronation special episode.

Synopsis
The Windsors tells the story of the British royal family but re-imagined as a soap opera. Although the stories are completely fictional, they are inspired by real events.

Cast

Main
 Harry Enfield as Prince Charles, the oldest son of and heir apparent to Elizabeth II, who is impatiently waiting for his mother to die so he can finally be King of the United Kingdom. He is portrayed as self-absorbed, naive, overconfident in his abilities, and prone to believe in comically absurd theories, having little knowledge of the world outside the monarchy. He also enjoys inventing whimsical ideas for which he feels under-appreciated. A running gag is his fondness for wearing kilts without any undergarments.
 Enfield also portrays Charles' two-minutes-older identical twin brother Chuck in Series 2, Episode 3.
 Haydn Gwynne as Princess Camilla, Charles' second wife, depicted as a stereotypical conniving villain determined to become Queen and redeem herself in the eyes of the public as a result of usurping Diana's position. She fixates on various ways in which she might achieve this but never fulfills any of the schemes she imagines.
 Hugh Skinner as Prince William "Wills", Charles' first son and the most well-meaning of the royals, who is second in line to the throne and whose manner of speech exaggerates parts of received pronunciation. He often attempts to leave the monarchy, to get it abolished, or to simply grow out of his family's shadow by pursuing interests and career opportunities outside of royal duties. He also receives advice and counsel from spirits of previous monarchs of England and of the whole UK, as do his wife and brother.
 Louise Ford as Princess Catherine "Kate", Wills' wife, depicted as a former gypsy traveller who wants to better fit in with the royals.
 Richard Goulding (Series 1–2) and Tom Durant-Pritchard (Series 3) as Prince Harry, Wills' immature, naive younger brother, who is often taken advantage of by women and is illiterate until the end of Series 1.
 Kathryn Drysdale as Meghan Markle (Series 2–3), Harry's second girlfriend and later his wife, portrayed as a shallow narcissist who is still obsessed with her time acting on the American legal drama TV series Suits and presenting herself as a "strong independent woman" despite her desire to marry Harry.
 Morgana Robinson as Pippa Middleton, Kate's sister, depicted as a passive-aggressive, greedy, promiscuous, and envious social climber. She pursues a relationship with Harry and continues trying to win him back after he begins dating Meghan.
 Ellie White as Princess Beatrice and Celeste Dring as Princess Eugenie, Wills and Harry's cousins, depicted as two useless, rich Sloanes searching for purpose in life.

Recurring
 Matthew Cottle as Prince Edward, Charles' youngest brother, who fails at many things.
 Katy Wix as Fergie, Beatrice and Eugenie's mother, who is desperate to be let back into the Royal Family’s inner circle.
 Tim Wallers as Prince Andrew, Charles' younger brother and Fergie's former husband, portrayed as a sleazy businessman.
 Vicki Pepperdine as Princess Anne, Charles' younger sister, depicted as austere, menacing, and almost ghostlike. Her sudden appearances are preceded by a drop in temperature that freezes people's breath.
 Prince Philip, Charles' father and Wills and Harry's grandfather, who does not physically appear except for one scene, in which he is shown only from the back. He normally communicates by sending his family brutally honest, profanity-laced letters, which they read aloud.
 Gordon Kennedy as Alec and Tony Jayawardena as Sandy (Series 1), two Scottish bystanders who comment on events.
 Donovan Blackwood as Baxter (Series 1), a military recruiter and drill instructor with whom Wills trains to become an air ambulance pilot.

Guests

 Lucy Montgomery as Elizabeth I
 Paul Whitehouse as George III
 Tim FitzHigham as King Arthur
 Howard Lee as Alfred the Great
 David Newman as Richard the Lionheart
 Gillian Bevan as Theresa May
 Corey Johnson as Donald Trump
 Joseph May as Justin Trudeau
 Phillip Law as Malcolm Turnbull
 Tom Basden as Jeremy Corbyn
 Jeremy Nicholas as David Dimbleby
 Amy Booth-Steel as Nicola Sturgeon
 Julia Deakin as Carole Middleton
 Simon Day as Mike Middleton
 Tom Stourton as Jack Brooksbank
 Mateo Oxley as Edo Mapelli Mozzi
 Suzette Llewellyn as Doria Ragland
 Trevor Cooper as Thomas Markle
 Miriam Margolyes as Queen Victoria
 Michael Rouse as Prince Albert
 Jolyon Coy as Henry V of England
 James Doherty as Henry VIII
 Gareth Tunley as Oliver Cromwell
 Al Roberts as Richard III
 Dickie Beau as James VI and I
 Clive Hayward as George VI

Episodes

Series overview

Series 1 (2016)

Christmas special (2016)

Series 2 (2017)

Royal Wedding special (2018)

Series 3 (2020)
Channel 4 stated that a third series of The Windsors would premiere early in 2020. The production aims to address recent topical stories about the Royal Family, including the apparent feud between Wills and Kate and Harry and Meghan. Tom Durant-Pritchard took over the role of Prince Harry from Richard Goulding. The six-episode series began broadcasting on 25 February 2020.

Endgame stage play 

On 9 June 2021, it was announced that a stage play called The Windsors: Endgame will open at the Prince of Wales Theatre in London's West End from 2 August to 9 October 2021. It will be written by Jeffrie and Tyler-Moore, directed by Michael Fentiman and feature members of the cast from the TV show including Harry Enfield as Charles, Matthew Cottle as Edward, Tom Durant-Pritchard as Harry and Tim Wallers as Andrew.

Coronation special (2023)

Channel 4 stated that a Coronation special was planned in 2023. Bert Tyler-Moore is now the sole writer after the death of George Jeffrie.

Series 4 (2023)
Channel 4 stated that a fourth series of The Windsors would premiere in 2023.

Reception
The Guardian was favourable when it said "High-brow humour this is not. But, despite a number of cast and crew comparing the show to Spitting Image, The Windsors doesn't feel like satire: more a comic drama that makes the odd comment about monarchy."

Channel 4 described the show, in a statement: "The series is a wry take on what the soap opera of their lives (and loves) might just be like. Delving behind the headlines and gossip columns, The Windsors lets our imaginations run riot in this ludicrous parody. Imagine, who really controls the sceptre in Charles and Camilla's marriage? What do the Royals really think of Kate? Does Wills really want to be king? Will Harry ever take Pippa up the aisle or will they end on a bum note? And what do Beatrice and Eugenie actually do for a living?" C4's head of comedy Phil Clarke added: "In The Windsors, our much-loved Royal family is re-imagined through the lens of a soap opera, and although the stories are completely fictional, some are inspired by real events. As a result, writers Bert and George have outdone even the funniest, most ludicrous issue of Hello! magazine ever."

The Daily Telegraph wrote: "The Windsors was low-budget, crude and rude. But it was all done with such cacophonous relish that resistance was useless. There's not much of this kind of punk comedy around on television at the moment, where deep, mordant, The Office-style irony has long been the dominant mode. But who doesn't like a little mischief? You can be a fan of Beethoven and the Buzzcocks too."

In his review for The List, Brian Donaldson wrote: "A pitiful 'parody' of life down Buck House way!. If you were writing a sitcom about the Royal Family, would you have Harry coming over as a bit thick, Fergie being rather attention-seeking and Camilla as a cartoon villain? Of course you wouldn't, as that would be way too obvious; though maybe you could go down that road and put a spin on it somehow? Not Jeffrie and Tyler-Moore as they do the obvious and a whole lot less, such as making Edward out to be a lost soul with an empty diary, having William as a square-jawed helicopter hero and Pippa enjoying people constantly gazing at her 'fantastic arse'. And most incredibly of all, the Duke of Edinburgh is, wait for it, a little bit racist. It's certainly gratifying to see some upcoming Fringe comedy acts landing parts, such as Ellie White and Celeste Dring as the all-too predictably shallow Beatrice and Eugenie while Katy Wix has a blast as their tragically pitiable mum. But, sadly, all the talent on show are let down by a woefully predictable and utterly laugh-free script. Off with their heads!"

Season 2 of The Windsors was described by The Guardian as 'riotous hilarity', while The Telegraph called it a "right royal romp".

Sam Wollaston, writing for The Guardian, said of the Royal Wedding Special, "I worried an hour might be a stretch, but I needn't have", and suggested that the characters of Beatrice and Eugenie should have their own spin-off series.

References

External links 
Official site

ComedyUK

2016 British television series debuts
2020 British television series endings
2010s British satirical television series
2010s British sitcoms
2020s British satirical television series
2020s British sitcoms
British parody television series
Channel 4 comedy
Cultural depictions of British monarchs
Cultural depictions of Charles III
English-language television shows
Television series about cousins
Television series about dysfunctional families
Television series about marriage
Television series about siblings